The 1947 Chatham Cup was the 20th annual nationwide knockout football competition in New Zealand.

The competition was run on a regional basis, with regional associations each holding separate qualifying rounds. Teams taking part in the final rounds are known to have included North Shore United (Auckland), Waterside (Wellington) Wanganui Technical Old Boys (Whanganui), St. Andrews (Manawatu), Technical Old Boys (Christchurch), Northern Hearts (Timaru), Mosgiel (Dunedin) and Invercargill Thistle (Southland).

The 1947 final
The 1947 final was played in ideal conditions in front of 6000 spectators at the Basin Reserve in Wellington. After the match the cup was awarded to the Waterside captain by the Governor-General of New Zealand of the time, Bernard Freyberg, 1st Baron Freyberg VC.

Bob Bolton, Toby Janes, and Tom Walker became the first players to play in four winning sides, having previously played for Waterside in the 1938, 1939, and 1940 finals. Waterside dominated the final, but no goals were scored in the first period. In the second half, Mark Bell scored for Waterside, only to have Colin Bailey equalise before the final whistle. The only goal of extra time came through Waterside's Toby Janes. Mr. J. Sanderson of Wellington became only the second referee (after G. Jackson) to officiate at two finals, having also been in charge in the 1933 final.

Results

References

Rec.Sport.Soccer Statistics Foundation New Zealand 1947 page

Chatham Cup
Chatham Cup
Chatham Cup